Red Lodge is a village and civil parish situated in rural Suffolk, England, between Mildenhall and Newmarket, and very close to the A11 and A14 roads.

The village
Red Lodge is a growing community administered by West Suffolk Council. It has new homes from a variety of building companies centred on the Kings Warren development at the northern end of the village. Currently, community facilities include an Ecumenical church, village hall and venue (known as the Millennium Centre), a sports pavilion with tennis courts, a five-a-side football pitch and allotments. A new school opened in September 2012 and the new village centre which opened in 2014 has a convenience store, fish and chip shop, kebab shop, pharmacy, hair dressers and estate agents. The Red Lodge Steakhouse Restaurant and Pub recently opened its doors too after an extensive refurbishment of the original pub building which is the oldest recorded building in the village.

History of the community
The village dates back to 1926 when the first houses were built, although the pub, Red Lodge Inn, is far older, having been recorded on a map of the site in 1885. It is thought to be a former hunting lodge dating back to the 17th century. The area where most of the new housing is situated was formerly a rabbit warren attached to Freckenham Manor lands, with a history dating back to the 13th century. Red Lodge became a civil parish in 1987, having previously been part of Freckenham parish.

Fictional reference
The 2010 Doctor Who audio drama The Demons of Red Lodge is set in Red Lodge in 1665.

Red Lodge Heath

Red Lodge Heath is an area of acid grassland and lowland and is an SSSI, with a number of nationally rare plants and animals. It includes a population of the five-banded tailed digger wasp, Cerceris quinquefasciata, which nests in bare sand along a path to the north of the site, and on sparsely vegetated slopes to the west. Discovery of the wasp population in 2005 by English Nature meant that Forest Heath District Council had to adapt proposed housing and school development plans in this area of the village.

The Heath is maintained by volunteers from a conservation group established in 2007 and awarded a Lottery grant in 2012.

Transport links
Buses also serve the village, offering transportation to Mildenhall, Newmarket, Bury St Edmunds and other nearby towns and villages. National Express coaches operate services from nearby Mildenhall to Central London; Cambridge; Brighton via Stansted, Heathrow and Gatwick Airports.

Other local businesses
Red Lodge had a long-established transport café which was renowned as being open 24 hours a day. This is now not the case and it recently closed down after many years. Red Lodge Karting, is reputed to be one of the largest non-MSA tracks in the country, with two circuits of 1200m and 700m. Other nearby venues include WildTracks centre in Kennett, which offers activities including archery, motorcross and off-roading.

Education
St Christopher's CEVCP School in Bellflower Crescent opened in September 2012 and replaced Tuddenham Primary School, which was too small for the number of students. It is a Church of England voluntary faith school, meaning that Christian values are promoted within the curriculum and all faiths are welcomed. It has capacity for 315 pupils, with further development planned to increase capacity to 420. It delivers education for 5- to 11-year-olds and follows the National Curriculum.

The two-storey school is accessible by people with different physical abilities. Teaching facilities include interactive multi-media systems in classrooms, art, design technology and food technology areas, playing field, hard court, hall and drama studio.

In the last Ofsted inspection in 2009 (which took place at the Tuddenham premises), the school was rated 2 (good).

Local groups

References

External links

 Red Lodge Parish Council
 Red Lodge Conservation Group
 St Christopher's CEVCP School

Villages in Suffolk
Civil parishes in Suffolk
Forest Heath